The Rosa L. Parks School of Fine and Performing Arts is a four-year public high school in Paterson in Passaic County, New Jersey, United States, serving students in ninth through twelfth grades as part of the Paterson Public Schools. In October 1986, Rosa Parks honored the school family at the opening ceremony by cutting the ribbon. To date, it is the only high school in the United States named after her.

The school provides training in each of eight art majors: Commercial Art, Fine Art, Dance, Drama, Vocal, Instrumental, Piano, and Communication Arts (formerly known as Creative Writing). Communication Arts, however, is not recognized as a major, due to the fact that it is not considered a fine art anymore. Paterson residents in eighth grade can apply for admission to Rosa Parks School, with acceptance based on a competitive audition process, which may include a submission of an art or writing portfolio.

As of the 2021–22 school year, the school had an enrollment of 219 students and 25.0 classroom teachers (on an FTE basis), for a student–teacher ratio of 8.8:1. There were 113 students (51.6% of enrollment) eligible for free lunch and none eligible for reduced-cost lunch.

Awards, recognition and rankings
The school was the 226th-ranked public high school in New Jersey out of 339 schools statewide in New Jersey Monthly magazine's September 2014 cover story on the state's "Top Public High Schools", using a new ranking methodology. The school had been ranked 254th in the state of 328 schools in 2012, after being ranked 123rd in 2010 out of 322 schools listed. The magazine ranked the school 137th in 2008 out of 316 schools. The school was ranked 127th in the magazine's September 2006 issue, which surveyed 316 schools across the state.

Schooldigger.com ranked the school 284th out of 367 public high schools statewide in its 2010 rankings (a decrease of 106 positions from the 2009 rank) which were based on the combined percentage of students classified as proficient or above proficient on the language arts literacy and mathematics components of the  High School Proficiency Assessment (HSPA).

Administration
The school's principal is Nicolette Thompson.

Notable alumni
 Essence Carson (born 1986), basketball player for the New York Liberty.
 T. J. Hill (born 1980), plays for the Edmonton Eskimos.

References

External links 
School website
Paterson Public Schools

School Data for the Paterson Public Schools, National Center for Education Statistics

1986 establishments in New Jersey
Educational institutions established in 1986
Education in Paterson, New Jersey
Public high schools in Passaic County, New Jersey